Étoile Sportive de Radès, commonly known as ES Radès, is a Tunisian professional basketball club from Radès, Tunis. The club competes in the Championnat National A, the country's premier league. The Salle Couverte Taoufik-Bouhima is their home.

Several of its players have played for Tunisia's national basketball team.

Honours

Domestic competitions
Tunisian League
Champions (13): 1964, 1965, 1966, 1967, 1968, 1969, 1970, 1971, 1972, 1976, 1984, 2017, 2018
Tunisian Cup
Champions (12): 1961, 1962, 1963, 1964, 1965, 1968, 1970, 1971, 1972, 2017, 2018, 2019

International competitions
FIBA Africa Clubs Champions Cup
Runners-up (2): 2014, 2017

Current roster

Coaches

Notable players

 Hamdi Braa
 Smush Parker

See also
ES Radès (football)

References

External links
Official facebook page (football and basketball)

Basketball teams in Tunisia
Basketball teams established in 1948
1948 establishments in Tunisia
Sports clubs in Radès